Samuel Jackson (March 24, 1849 – August 4, 1930) was an English born professional baseball player. He played second base for the  Boston Red Stockings and the  Brooklyn Atlantics of the National Association.

References

External links

1849 births
1930 deaths
19th-century baseball players
Boston Red Stockings players
Brooklyn Atlantics players
English emigrants to the United States
Major League Baseball players from the United Kingdom
Major League Baseball players from England
English baseball players
People from Ripon
Sportspeople from Yorkshire